The FIL European Luge Championships 1986 took place in Hammarstrand, Sweden for the fourth time after hosting the event previously in 1970, 1976, and 1978. It also marked the last time that the championships would take place on a natural track with the events now over at the FIL European Luge Natural Track Championships which started in 1970.

Men's singles

Women's singles

Men's doubles

Medal table

References
Men's doubles European champions
Men's singles European champions
Women's singles European champions

FIL European Luge Championships
1986 in luge
Luge in Sweden
1998 in Swedish sport